A radiometer or roentgenometer is a device for measuring the radiant flux (power) of electromagnetic radiation. Generally, a radiometer is an infrared radiation detector or an ultraviolet detector. Microwave radiometers operate in the microwave wavelengths.

While the term radiometer can refer to any device that measures electromagnetic radiation (e.g. light), the term is often used to refer specifically to a Crookes radiometer ("light-mill"), a device invented in 1873 in which a rotor (having vanes which are dark on one side, and light on the other) in a partial vacuum spins when exposed to light. 
A common belief (one originally held even by Crookes) is that the momentum of the absorbed light on the black faces makes the radiometer operate. 
If this were true, however, the radiometer would spin away from the non-black faces, since the photons bouncing off those faces impart more momentum than the photons absorbed on the black faces. 
Photons do exert radiation pressure on the faces, but those forces are dwarfed by other effects.
The currently accepted explanation depends on having just the right degree of vacuum, and relates to the transfer of heat rather than the direct effect of photons.  

A Nichols radiometer demonstrates photon pressure.  It is much more sensitive than the Crookes radiometer and it operates in a complete vacuum, whereas operation of the Crookes radiometer requires an imperfect vacuum.

The MEMS radiometer can operate on the principles of Nichols or Crookes and can operate over a wide spectrum of wavelength and particle energy levels.

See also 

 Active cavity radiometer
 Bolometer
 Copernicus
 His Dark Materials
 Net radiometer
 Photon rocket
 Pyranometer
 Radiation pressure
 Radiometry
 Solar sail
 Spectroradiometer

References

External links 

https://www.youtube.com/watch?v=teEhoUB-FQE&list=UUXrJjdDeqLgGjJbP1sMnH8A Short video pertinent to the topic.

Electromagnetic radiation meters
Radiometry